The Pride of Chaozhou (Traditional Chinese: 我來自潮州, Literally I am From Teochew) is a television drama series produced by Hong Kong broadcaster Asia Television in the 1990s. 

The series is known for its depiction of the unique culture of Teochew. It is also considered to be a semi-autobiography of Lim Por-yen, owner and CEO of ATV at the time, being a Teochew native, hence it was rebroadcast after Lim's death.

Synopsis
The series revolves around the Teochew area as well as Hong Kong, where the main protagonists continued their career after the establishment of the People's Republic of China. It took place during World War II.

Hong Kong television shows